Ornithocephalus gladiatus is a species of orchid found from Grenada, Trinidad, the Guianas, Venezuela, Ecuador, Peru, Bolivia and Brazil.

References

External links 

gladiatus
Flora of Grenada
Orchids of Trinidad
Orchids of South America
Plants described in 1824